John Peyto-Verney may refer to:
 John Peyto-Verney, 14th Baron Willoughby de Broke (1738–1816)
 John Peyto-Verney, 15th Baron Willoughby de Broke (1762–1820)